This page lists all described species of the spider family Amaurobiidae accepted by the World Spider Catalog :

A

Altellopsis

Altellopsis Simon, 1905
 A. helveola Simon, 1905 (type) — Argentina

Amaurobius

Amaurobius C. L. Koch, 1837
 A. agastus (Chamberlin, 1947) — USA
 A. annulatus (Kulczyński, 1906) — Montenegro
 A. antipovae Marusik & Kovblyuk, 2004 — Caucasus (Russia, Georgia)
 A. ausobskyi Thaler & Knoflach, 1998 — Greece
 A. barbaricus Leech, 1972 — USA
 A. barbarus Simon, 1911 — Algeria, Spain
 A. borealis Emerton, 1909 — USA, Canada
 A. candia Thaler & Knoflach, 2002 — Greece (Crete)
 A. caucasicus Marusik, Otto & Japoshvili, 2020 — Georgia
 A. cerberus Fage, 1931 — Spain
 A. corruptus Leech, 1972 — USA
 A. crassipalpis Canestrini & Pavesi, 1870 — Germany, Switzerland, Italy
 A. cretaensis Wunderlich, 1995 — Greece (Crete)
 A. deelemanae Thaler & Knoflach, 1995 — Bulgaria, Greece (incl. Crete)
 A. diablo Leech, 1972 — USA
 A. distortus Leech, 1972 — USA
 A. dorotheae (Chamberlin, 1947) — USA
 A. drenskii Kratochvíl, 1934 — Bosnia and Herzegovina
 A. erberi (Keyserling, 1863) — Canary Is., Europe, Turkey, Caucasus
 A. fenestralis (Ström, 1768) (type) — Europe to Central Asia
 A. ferox (Walckenaer, 1830) — Europe, Turkey. Introduced to Canada, USA, Mexico
 A. festae Caporiacco, 1934 — Libya
 A. galeritus Leech, 1972 — USA
 A. geminus Thaler & Knoflach, 2002 — Greece (Crete)
 A. hagiellus (Chamberlin, 1947) — USA
 A. heathi (Chamberlin, 1947) — USA
 A. hercegovinensis Kulczyński, 1915 — Bosnia and Herzegovina, Montenegro
 A. intermedius Leech, 1972 — USA
 A. jugorum L. Koch, 1868 — Europe. Introduced to India
 A. kratochvili Miller, 1938 — Croatia, Albania
 A. latebrosus Simon, 1874 — France (Corsica)
 A. latescens (Chamberlin, 1919) — USA
 A. leechi Brignoli, 1983 — USA
 A. lesbius Bosmans, 2011 — Greece
 A. longipes Thaler & Knoflach, 1995 — Greece
 A. mathetes (Chamberlin, 1947) — USA
 A. mephisto (Chamberlin, 1947) — USA
 A. minor Kulczyński, 1915 — Eastern Europe
 A. minorca Barrientos & Febrer, 2018 — Spain (Menorca)
 A. minutus Leech, 1972 — USA
 A. obustus L. Koch, 1868 — Europe
 A. occidentalis Simon, 1893 — Portugal, Spain, France
 A. ossa Thaler & Knoflach, 1993 — Greece
 A. pallidus L. Koch, 1868 — Southeastern Europe to Georgia
 A. palomar Leech, 1972 — USA
 A. paon Thaler & Knoflach, 1993 — Greece
 A. pavesii Pesarini, 1991 — Italy
 A. pelops Thaler & Knoflach, 1991 — Greece
 A. pesarinii Ballarin & Pantini, 2017 — Italy
 A. phaeacus Thaler & Knoflach, 1998 — Albania, North Macedonia, Greece
 A. prosopidus Leech, 1972 — USA
 A. ruffoi Thaler, 1990 — Italy
 A. scopolii Thorell, 1871 — France, Italy, Slovenia
 A. similis (Blackwall, 1861) — Europe, Caucasus. Introduced to North America
 A. songi Zhang, Wang & Zhang, 2018 — China
 A. spinatus Zhang, Wang & Zhang, 2018 — China
 A. strandi Charitonov, 1937 — Greece, Bulgaria, Ukraine
 A. tamalpais Leech, 1972 — USA
 A. thoracicus Mello-Leitão, 1945 — Argentina
 A. transversus Leech, 1972 — USA
 A. triangularis Leech, 1972 — USA
 A. tristis L. Koch, 1875 — Eritrea
 A. tulare Leech, 1972 — USA
 A. vachoni Hubert, 1965 — Spain
 A. vexans Leech, 1972 — USA

Anisacate

Anisacate Mello-Leitão, 1941
 A. fragile Mello-Leitão, 1941 (type) — Argentina
 A. fuegianum (Simon, 1884) — Chile, Argentina
 A. f. bransfieldi (Usher, 1983) — Falkland Is.
 A. tigrinum (Mello-Leitão, 1941) — Argentina

Arctobius

Arctobius Lehtinen, 1967
 A. agelenoides (Emerton, 1919) (type) — USA (Alaska), Canada, Northern Europe, Russia (Far East)

Auhunga

Auhunga Forster & Wilton, 1973
 A. pectinata Forster & Wilton, 1973 (type) — New Zealand

Auximella

Auximella Strand, 1908
 A. harpagula (Simon, 1906) — Ecuador
 A. minensis (Mello-Leitão, 1926) — Brazil
 A. producta (Chamberlin, 1916) — Peru
 A. spinosa (Mello-Leitão, 1926) — Brazil
 A. subdifficilis (Mello-Leitão, 1920) — Brazil
 A. typica Strand, 1908 (type) — Peru

C

Callevopsis

Callevopsis Tullgren, 1902
 C. striata Tullgren, 1902 (type) — Chile, Argentina

Callobius

Callobius Chamberlin, 1947
 C. amamiensis Okumura, Honki & Ohba, 2018 — Japan
 C. angelus (Chamberlin & Ivie, 1947) — USA
 C. arizonicus (Chamberlin & Ivie, 1947) — USA, Mexico
 C. balcanicus (Drensky, 1940) — Bulgaria
 C. bennetti (Blackwall, 1846) (type) — USA, Canada
 C. breviprocessus Okumura, Suzuki & Serita, 2020 — Japan (Ryukyu Is.)
 C. canada (Chamberlin & Ivie, 1947) — USA, Canada
 C. claustrarius (Hahn, 1833) — Europe, Turkey, Caucasus to Kazakhstan
 C. deces (Chamberlin & Ivie, 1947) — USA
 C. enus (Chamberlin & Ivie, 1947) — USA, Canada
 C. gertschi Leech, 1972 — USA
 C. guachama Leech, 1972 — USA
 C. hokkaido Leech, 1971 — Russia (Kurile Is.), Japan
 C. hyonasus Leech, 1972 — USA
 C. kamelus (Chamberlin & Ivie, 1947) — USA
 C. klamath Leech, 1972 — USA
 C. koreanus (Paik, 1966) — Korea
 C. manzanita Leech, 1972 — USA
 C. nevadensis (Simon, 1884) — USA
 C. nomeus (Chamberlin, 1919) — USA, Canada
 C. olympus (Chamberlin & Ivie, 1947) — USA
 C. panther Leech, 1972 — USA
 C. paskenta Leech, 1972 — USA
 C. pauculus Leech, 1972 — USA
 C. paynei Leech, 1972 — USA
 C. pictus (Simon, 1884) — USA, Canada
 C. rothi Leech, 1972 — USA
 C. severus (Simon, 1884) — USA, Canada
 C. sierra Leech, 1972 — USA
 C. tamarus (Chamberlin & Ivie, 1947) — USA
 C. tehama Leech, 1972 — USA
 C. yakushimensis Okumura, 2010 — Japan

Cavernocymbium

Cavernocymbium Ubick, 2005
 C. prentoglei Ubick, 2005 — USA
 C. vetteri Ubick, 2005 (type) — USA

Chresiona

Chresiona Simon, 1903
 C. convexa Simon, 1903 — South Africa
 C. invalida (Simon, 1898) — South Africa
 C. nigrosignata Simon, 1903 (type) — South Africa

Chumma

Chumma Jocqué, 2001
 C. bicolor Jocqué & Alderweireldt, 2018 — South Africa
 C. foliata Jocqué & Alderweireldt, 2018 — South Africa
 C. gastroperforata Jocqué, 2001 — South Africa
 C. inquieta Jocqué, 2001 (type) — South Africa
 C. interfluvialis Jocqué & Alderweireldt, 2018 — South Africa
 C. lesotho Jocqué & Alderweireldt, 2018 — Lesotho
 C. striata Jocqué & Alderweireldt, 2018 — South Africa
 C. subridens Jocqué & Alderweireldt, 2018 — South Africa
 C. tsitsikamma Jocqué & Alderweireldt, 2018 — South Africa

Cybaeopsis

Cybaeopsis Strand, 1907
 C. armipotens (Bishop & Crosby, 1926) — USA
 C. euopla (Bishop & Crosby, 1935) — USA, Canada
 C. hoplites (Bishop & Crosby, 1926) — USA
 C. hoplomacha (Bishop & Crosby, 1926) — USA
 C. macaria (Chamberlin, 1947) — USA
 C. pantopla (Bishop & Crosby, 1935) — USA
 C. spenceri (Leech, 1972) — USA
 C. tibialis (Emerton, 1888) — USA, Canada
 C. typica Strand, 1907 (type) — Russia (Sakhalin, Kurile Is.), Japan
 C. wabritaska (Leech, 1972) — USA, Canada

D

Dardurus

Dardurus Davies, 1976
 D. agrestis Davies, 1976 — Australia (Queensland)
 D. nemoralis Davies, 1976 — Australia (Queensland)
 D. saltuosus Davies, 1976 — Australia (New South Wales)
 D. silvaticus Davies, 1976 — Australia (Queensland)
 D. spinipes Davies, 1976 (type) — Australia (Queensland)
 D. tamborinensis Davies, 1976 — Australia (Queensland)

Daviesa

Daviesa Koçak & Kemal, 2008
 D. gallonae (Davies, 1993) — Australia (Queensland)
 D. lubinae (Davies, 1993) (type) — Australia (Queensland)

E

Ecurobius

Ecurobius Zamani & Marusik, 2021
 E. parthicus Zamani & Marusik, 2021 (type) — Iran

Emmenomma

Emmenomma Simon, 1884
 E. joshuabelli Almeida-Silva, Griswold & Brescovit, 2015 — Chile
 E. obscurum Simon, 1905 — Argentina
 E. oculatum Simon, 1884 (type) — Chile, Argentina, Falkland Is.

H

Hicanodon

Hicanodon Tullgren, 1901
 H. cinerea Tullgren, 1901 (type) — Chile, Argentina

Himalmartensus

Himalmartensus Wang & Zhu, 2008
 H. ausobskyi Wang & Zhu, 2008 — Nepal
 H. martensi Wang & Zhu, 2008 (type) — Nepal
 H. mussooriensis (Biswas & Roy, 2008) — India
 H. nandadevi Quasin, Siliwal & Uniyal, 2015 — India
 H. nepalensis Wang & Zhu, 2008 — Nepal

L

Livius

Livius Roth, 1967
 L. macrospinus Roth, 1967 (type) — Chile

M

Macrobunus

Macrobunus Tullgren, 1901
 M. backhauseni (Simon, 1896) (type) — Chile, Argentina
 M. caffer (Simon, 1898) — South Africa
 M. chilensis (Simon, 1889) — Chile
 M. madrynensis (Tullgren, 1901) — Argentina
 M. multidentatus (Tullgren, 1902) — Chile

Malenella

Malenella Ramírez, 1995
 M. nana Ramírez, 1995 (type) — Chile

Maloides

Maloides Forster & Wilton, 1989
 M. cavernicola (Forster & Wilton, 1973) (type) — New Zealand

Muritaia

Muritaia Forster & Wilton, 1973
 M. kaituna Forster & Wilton, 1973 — New Zealand
 M. longispinata Forster & Wilton, 1973 — New Zealand
 M. orientalis Forster & Wilton, 1973 — New Zealand
 M. parabusa Forster & Wilton, 1973 — New Zealand
 M. suba Forster & Wilton, 1973 (type) — New Zealand

N

Naevius

Naevius Roth, 1967
 N. calilegua Compagnucci & Ramírez, 2000 — Argentina
 N. manu Brescovit & Bonaldo, 1996 — Peru
 N. varius (Keyserling, 1879) (type) — Peru
 N. zongo Brescovit & Bonaldo, 1996 — Bolivia

Neoporteria

Neoporteria Mello-Leitão, 1943
 N. annulata Roth, 1967 — Chile
 N. pracellans Mello-Leitão, 1943 (type) — Chile

Neuquenia

Neuquenia Mello-Leitão, 1940
 N. pallida Mello-Leitão, 1940 (type) — Argentina
 N. paupercula (Simon, 1905) — Argentina

O

Obatala

Obatala Lehtinen, 1967
 O. armata Lehtinen, 1967 (type) — South Africa

Otira

Otira Forster & Wilton, 1973
 O. canasta Forster & Wilton, 1973 — New Zealand
 O. indura Forster & Wilton, 1973 — New Zealand
 O. liana Forster & Wilton, 1973 — New Zealand
 O. parva Forster & Wilton, 1973 — New Zealand
 O. satura Forster & Wilton, 1973 (type) — New Zealand
 O. terricola Forster & Wilton, 1973 — New Zealand

Ovtchinnikovia

Ovtchinnikovia Marusik, Kovblyuk & Ponomarev, 2010
 O. caucasica Marusik, Kovblyuk & Ponomarev, 2010 (type) — Russia (Caucasus)

Oztira

Oztira Milledge, 2011
 O. affinis (Hickman, 1981) (type) — Australia (Tasmania)
 O. aquilonaria (Davies, 1986) — Australia (Queensland)
 O. kroombit Milledge, 2011 — Australia (Queensland)
 O. summa (Davies, 1986) — Australia (Queensland)

P

Parazanomys

Parazanomys Ubick, 2005
 P. thyasionnes Ubick, 2005 (type) — USA

Pimus

Pimus Chamberlin, 1947
 P. desiccatus Leech, 1972 — USA
 P. eldorado Leech, 1972 — USA
 P. fractus (Chamberlin, 1920) — USA
 P. hesperellus Chamberlin, 1947 — USA
 P. iviei Leech, 1972 — USA
 P. leucus Chamberlin, 1947 — USA
 P. napa Leech, 1972 — USA
 P. nawtawaketus Leech, 1972 — USA
 P. pitus Chamberlin, 1947 (type) — USA
 P. salemensis Leech, 1972 — USA

Pseudauximus

Pseudauximus Simon, 1902
 P. annulatus Purcell, 1908 — South Africa
 P. pallidus Purcell, 1904 — South Africa
 P. reticulatus Simon, 1902 (type) — South Africa

R

Retiro

Retiro Mello-Leitão, 1915
 R. crinitus (Simon, 1893) — Venezuela
 R. fulvipes (Simon, 1906) — Ecuador
 R. granadensis (Keyserling, 1878) — Colombia
 R. gratus (Bryant, 1948) — Hispaniola
 R. lanceolatus (Vellard, 1924) — Brazil
 R. maculatus Mello-Leitão, 1915 (type) — Brazil
 R. nigronotatus Mello-Leitão, 1947 — Brazil
 R. plagiatus (Simon, 1893) — Venezuela
 R. procerulus (Simon, 1906) — Ecuador
 R. quitensis (Simon, 1906) — Ecuador
 R. rhombifer (Simon, 1906) — Ecuador
 R. roberti (Reimoser, 1939) — Costa Rica

Rhoicinaria

Rhoicinaria Exline, 1950
 R. maculata (Keyserling, 1878) — Colombia
 R. rorerae Exline, 1950 (type) — Ecuador

Rubrius

Rubrius Simon, 1887
 R. annulatus F. O. Pickard-Cambridge, 1899 — Chile
 R. antarcticus (Karsch, 1880) (type) — Chile, Argentina
 R. castaneifrons (Simon, 1884) — Chile
 R. lineatus Roth, 1967 — Chile
 R. major (Simon, 1904) — Chile
 R. scottae Mello-Leitão, 1940 — Argentina
 R. ululus Roth, 1967 — Chile

S

Storenosoma

Storenosoma Hogg, 1900
 S. altum Davies, 1986 — Australia (Queensland, New South Wales)
 S. bifidum Milledge, 2011 — Australia (Victoria)
 S. bondi Milledge, 2011 — Australia (New South Wales)
 S. forsteri Milledge, 2011 — Australia (New South Wales, Australian Capital Territory)
 S. grayi Milledge, 2011 — Australia (New South Wales)
 S. grossum Milledge, 2011 — Australia (Victoria)
 S. hoggi (Roewer, 1942) (type) — Australia (New South Wales, Victoria)
 S. picadilly Milledge, 2011 — Australia (New South Wales, Australian Capital Territory)
 S. smithae Milledge, 2011 — Australia (New South Wales)
 S. supernum Davies, 1986 — Australia (Queensland, New South Wales)
 S. tasmaniensis Milledge, 2011 — Australia (Tasmania)
 S. terraneum Davies, 1986 — Australia (Queensland to Victoria)
 S. victoria Milledge, 2011 — Australia (Victoria)

T

Taira

Taira Lehtinen, 1967
 T. cangshan Zhang, Zhu & Song, 2008 — China
 T. concava Zhang, Zhu & Song, 2008 — China
 T. decorata (Yin & Bao, 2001) — China
 T. flavidorsalis (Yaginuma, 1964) (type) — Japan
 T. latilabiata Zhang, Zhu & Song, 2008 — China
 T. liboensis Zhu, Chen & Zhang, 2004 — China
 T. obtusa Zhang, Zhu & Song, 2008 — China
 T. qiuae Wang, Jäger & Zhang, 2010 — China
 T. sichuanensis Wang, Jäger & Zhang, 2010 — China
 T. sulciformis Zhang, Zhu & Song, 2008 — China
 T. zhui Wang, Jäger & Zhang, 2010 — China

Tasmabrochus

Tasmabrochus Davies, 2002
 T. cranstoni Davies, 2002 (type) — Australia (Tasmania)
 T. montanus Davies, 2002 — Australia (Tasmania)
 T. turnerae Davies, 2002 — Australia (Tasmania)

Tasmarubrius

Tasmarubrius Davies, 1998
 T. hickmani Davies, 1998 — Australia (Tasmania)
 T. milvinus (Simon, 1903) (type) — Australia (Tasmania)
 T. pioneer Davies, 1998 — Australia (Tasmania)
 T. tarraleah Davies, 1998 — Australia (Tasmania)
 T. truncus Davies, 1998 — Australia (Tasmania)

Teeatta

Teeatta Davies, 2005
 T. driesseni Davies, 2005 (type) — Australia (Tasmania)
 T. magna Davies, 2005 — Australia (Tasmania)
 T. platnicki Davies, 2005 — Australia (Tasmania)

Tugana

Tugana Chamberlin, 1948
 T. cavatica (Bryant, 1940) (type) — Cuba
 T. crassa (Bryant, 1948) — Hispaniola
 T. cudina Alayón, 1992 — Cuba
 T. infumata (Bryant, 1948) — Hispaniola

Tymbira

Tymbira Mello-Leitão, 1944
 T. brunnea Mello-Leitão, 1944 (type) — Argentina

U

Urepus

Urepus Roth, 1967
 U. rossi Roth, 1967 (type) — Peru

V

Virgilus

Virgilus Roth, 1967
 V. normalis Roth, 1967 (type) — Ecuador

W

Wabarra

Wabarra Davies, 1996
 W. caverna Davies, 1996 — Australia (Queensland)
 W. pallida Davies, 1996 (type) — Australia (Queensland)

Waitetola

Waitetola Forster & Wilton, 1973
 W. huttoni Forster & Wilton, 1973 (type) — New Zealand

Y

Yacolla

Yacolla Lehtinen, 1967
 Y. pikelinae Lehtinen, 1967 (type) — Brazil

Yupanquia

Yupanquia Lehtinen, 1967
 Y. schiapelliae Lehtinen, 1967 (type) — Argentina

Z

Zanomys

Zanomys Chamberlin, 1948
 Z. aquilonia Leech, 1972 — USA, Canada
 Z. californica (Banks, 1904) — USA
 Z. feminina Leech, 1972 — USA
 Z. hesperia Leech, 1972 — USA
 Z. kaiba Chamberlin, 1948 (type) — USA
 Z. ochra Leech, 1972 — USA
 Z. sagittaria Leech, 1972 — USA
 Z. ultima Leech, 1972 — USA

References

Amaurobiidae